Penn Foster College is a private, for-profit online college headquartered in Scottsdale, Arizona. It was founded in 1890 as  International Correspondence Schools and presently offers bachelor's and associate degree programs in 22 certified programs, as well as academic certificates.

History
In 1890, Thomas J. Foster, a newspaper editor, founded the school to provide coal miners with education needed to advance in their careers and improve worker safety. At the turn of the century, the school was officially known as the International Correspondence Schools (ICS), and one out of every 27 adults in the U.S. had taken an ICS course. It was the first distance learning institution in the United States. In 1904, Foster expanded his school to the United Kingdom; this is now a separate distance education school called ICS Learn.

ICS was renamed Penn Foster in 2005, with Penn Foster High School and Penn Foster Career School being separated into separate institutions. Wicks Group, a private equity firm, purchased the school from Thomson Corporation in 2007. In December 2009, Penn Foster College was purchased by test preparation and educational support company The Princeton Review, and in 2012 the Princeton Review brand name and operations were bought for $33 million by Charlesbank Capital Partners, a private-equity firm. The parent company was renamed Education Holdings 1, Inc. In 2013, Education Holdings 1 filed for bankruptcy; it exited two months later.

In December 2015, Penn Foster acquired a competency-based learning platform built by UniversityNow. Bain Capital purchased the Penn Foster schools in 2018.

Academics
Penn Foster College offers associate degrees, bachelor's degrees, and undergraduate certificates through asynchronous online courses and instruction. The college does not participate in any federal or state aid programs, claiming that its education is affordable.

The college is accredited by the Distance Education Accrediting Commission (DEAC). Penn Foster College's Veterinary Technician Associate Degree and Veterinary Technology Bachelor of Applied Science Degree are accredited by the American Veterinary Medical Association (AVMA) through their Committee on Veterinary Technician Education and Activities (CVTEA). The college is also licensed by the Arizona State Board for Private Postsecondary Education, authorizing Penn Foster College to award Associate of Science degrees, Bachelor of Science degrees, and undergraduate certificates.

See also

 Penn Foster High School
 Penn Foster Career School

References

External links
 

Distance education institutions based in the United States
Distance Education Accreditation Commission